Cypholoba divisa is a species of ground beetles (insects in the family Carabidae).

References

External links 

 Cypholoba divisa at carabidae.org

Anthiinae (beetle)
Beetles described in 1860